The Devouring is the seventh studio album by Djam Karet, released on September 16, 1997 by Cuneiform Records.

Track listing

Personnel 
Adapted from The Devouring liner notes.

Djam Karet
 Gayle Ellett – electric guitar, 12-string acoustic guitar, 24-string steel acoustic guitar, koto, guitar synthesizer, keyboards, organ, mellotron, sampler, theremin, electronics, percussion
 Chuck Oken, Jr. – drums, percussion, keyboards
 Henry J. Osborne – bass guitar, electric guitar, acoustic guitar, keyboards, percussion

Additional musicians
 Judy Garp – violin (4)
 Mike Henderson – electric guitar and 12-string electric guitar (1–3, 5)
Production and additional personnel
 Dave Druse – cover art
 Djam Karet – production, recording, mixing

Release history

References

External links 
 The Devouring at Discogs (list of releases)
 The Devouring at Bandcamp

1997 albums
Djam Karet albums
Cuneiform Records albums